Ezio Meneghello (November 13, 1919 – October 11, 1987) was an Italian professional football player. He was born and died in Verona.

Honours
 Serie A champion: 1937/38, 1939/40.
 Coppa Italia winner: 1938/39.

1919 births
1987 deaths
Footballers from Verona
Italian footballers
Serie A players
Inter Milan players
Hellas Verona F.C. players
U.S. Lecce players
Taranto F.C. 1927 players
Calcio Padova players
Association football defenders
A.S.D. Fanfulla players